Panuwat Kongchan is a professional footballer from Thailand.

References

External links
Profile at Thaipremierleague.co.th

Living people
Panuwat Kongchan
1983 births
Panuwat Kongchan
Association football defenders
Panuwat Kongchan